Grass Creek is an unincorporated community in Wayne Township, Fulton County, Indiana, United States.

History
Grass Creek was so named from its location at the Grassy Creek. The community contained a post office from 1884 until 1964.

Geography

References

Unincorporated communities in Fulton County, Indiana
Unincorporated communities in Indiana